Antilohyrax was a genus of herbivorous mammal belonging to the order Hyracoidea. Fossils were found in 1983 in Egypt, 46 m above the bottom of the Jebel Qatrani Formation. The species Antilohyrax pectidens had an approximate weight of 33–35 kg. It had features not seen in other hyraxes, including a "broad hyper-pectinate comb-like first incisor" on its lower jaw, selenodont molars  and a rostrum similar to that seen in even-toed ungulates.

References

Prehistoric hyraxes
Prehistoric placental genera
Eocene mammals of Africa
Fossil taxa described in 2000